Hugh Pollock may refer to:

 Hugh MacDowell Pollock (1852–1937), Ulster Unionist member of the Parliament of Northern Ireland
 Hugh Alexander Pollock (1888–1971), British Army officer and publishing editor
 Hugh Pollock (footballer) (1865–1910), Scottish footballer